There's Gonna Be a Showdown is a 1969 album by American funk band Archie Bell & the Drells, released by the record label Atlantic. It was their last album released on Atlantic, and preceded a six-year gap before the recording of its follow-up, Dance Your Troubles Away, which appeared on producers Kenny Gamble and Leon Huff's own label, Philadelphia International.

Track listing
 "I Love My Baby" (Kenneth Gamble, Thom Bell)
 "Houston Texas" (Bobby Martin, Kenneth Gamble, Thom Bell)
 "(There's Gonna Be A) Showdown" (Kenneth Gamble, Leon Huff)
 "Giving Up Dancing" (Bobby Martin, Kenneth Gamble, Thom Bell)
 "Girl You're Too Young" (Archie Bell, Kenneth Gamble, Thom Bell)
 "Mama Didn't Teach Me That Way" (Archie Bell)
 "Do the Handjive" (Kenneth Gamble, Thom Bell)
 "My Balloon's Going Up" (Kenneth Gamble, Leon Huff)
 "Here I Go Again" (Kenneth Gamble, Leon Huff)
 "Go for What You Know" (Melvin Steals, Mervin Steals)
 "Green Power" (Melvin Steals, Mervin Steals)
 "Just a Little Closer" (Archie Bell)

References

Archie Bell & the Drells albums
1969 albums
Albums produced by Kenneth Gamble
Albums produced by Leon Huff
Atlantic Records albums